The 2022–23 Santa Clara Broncos men's basketball team represented Santa Clara University during the 2022–23 NCAA Division I men's basketball season. The Broncos are led by seventh-year head coach Herb Sendek and played their home games at the Leavey Center as members of the West Coast Conference.

Previous season
The Broncos finished the 2021–22 season 21–12, 10–5 in WCC play to finish in third place. They defeated Portland in the third round of the WCC tournament before losing in the semifinals to Saint Mary's. They received an invitation to the National Invitation Tournament, where they lost in the first round to Washington State.

Offseason

Departures

Incoming transfers

Recruiting

Roster

Schedule and results

|-
!colspan=9 style=| Non-conference regular season

|-
!colspan=9 style=| WCC regular season

|-
!colspan=9 style=| WCC tournament
 
|-
!colspan=9 style=| NIT

Source:

References

Santa Clara Broncos men's basketball seasons
Santa Clara
Santa Clara
Santa Clara
Santa Clara